Mi-ja is a Korean feminine given name. Its meaning differs based on the hanja used to write each syllable of the name. There are 33 hanja with the reading "mi" and 28 hanja with the reading "ja" on the South Korean government's official list of hanja which may be used in given names. Typically, "ja" is written with the hanja meaning "child". Names ending with this hanja, such as Young-ja and Jeong-ja, were popular when Korea was under Japanese rule, but declined in popularity afterwards.

People with this name include:
Lee Mi-ja (born 1941), South Korean trot singer
Son Mi-ja (born 1944), stage name Yoon Jeong-hee, South Korean actress
Son Mi-ja (born 1961), stage name Geum Bo-ra, South Korean actress
Lee Mi-ja (basketball) (born 1963), South Korean basketball player
Kim Mi-ja (born 1967), South Korean sprint canoer
Jeong Mi-ja (born 1970), South Korean long-distance runner who competed at the 1988 Summer Olympics
Oh Mi-ja (born 1970), South Korean long-distance runner who competed at the 1996 and 2000 Summer Olympics

Fictional characters with this name include:
Yun Mija, in 2011 Thai martial arts film The Kick
Mija, in 2017 South Korean adventure film Okja

See also
List of Korean given names

References

Korean feminine given names